Oswald Oberhuber (1 February 1931 – 17 January 2020) was an Austrian painter, sculptor, and graphic artist.

Biography
Oberhuber learned sculpture at the Federal Trade School in Innsbruck. He also studied at the Academy of Fine Arts Vienna and the State Academy of Fine Arts Stuttgart. In 1972, Oberhuber represented Austria at the Venice Biennale. The following year, he became a professor at the University of Applied Arts Vienna, where he worked until his retirement in 1998. The State Academy of Fine Arts Stuttgart recognized Oberhuber as an honorary member in 1982, and as an honorary senator in 2004.

Awards
Vienna Fine Arts Prize (1978)
Tyrolean State Arts Prize (1990)
Austrian State Prize (1990)
Cross of the Decoration of Honour for Services to the Republic of Austria (2004)

References

1931 births
2020 deaths
20th-century Austrian painters
20th-century male artists
20th-century Austrian sculptors
Graphic artists
People from Merano
Academy of Fine Arts Vienna alumni
Academic staff of the University of Applied Arts Vienna
Recipients of the Austrian State Prize
Recipients of the Decoration for Services to the Republic of Austria